Hár (also Hávi; Old Norse: 'High') and Hárr (Old Norse: prob. 'One-eyed') are among the many names of Odin. The Prose Edda depicts Hár ('High') in particular as one of the figures in the legendary trio (alongside Jafnhárr 'Equally-High' and Þriði 'Third') that answers the questions asked by Gangleri.

Name 
The name Hár means 'High' or 'High One' in Old Norse/Icelandic; it stems from an earlier Proto-Norse form *hauhaʀ. In the eddic poem Hávamál (Songs of Hávi), Odin adopts the name Hávi as a variant of Hár. According to the catalogue in the Völuspá ('Prophecy of the Völva'), Hár is also the name of a dwarf. 

The origin of the name Hárr remains unclear. A number of scholars, including Jan de Vries, E. O. G. Turville-Petre and Vladimir Orel, have proposed to translate it as 'One-eyed'. The word may derive from a Proto-Norse form reconstructed as *Haiha-hariʀ ('the One-eyed Hero'), itself a compound formed with the Proto-Germanic word *haihaz ('one-eyed'; cf. Gothic haihs 'one-eyed'). A Proto-Indo-European origin is also suggested by the Latin caecus ('blind') and the Old Irish caech ('one-eyed'), with regular Germanic sound shift *k- > *h-. Alternatively, Hárr has been interpreted as meaning 'the hoary one', 'with grey hair and beard', or else as an adjectival form of the lexeme Hár ('High One').

Attestations 
In Gylfaginning (The Beguiling of Gylfi), the king Gylfi, assuming the form of an old man named Gangleri, comes to visit the place of the gods Ásgard. But the Æsir (gods), who have foreseen his journey, prepare a visual delusion where Gylfi thinks he arrives at a great hall where he meets the chieftains Hár ('High'), Jafnhárr ('Equally-high'), and Þriði ('Third'). Then Gangleri asks the three men a series of questions about the identity of gods or the creation of the cosmos. The answers are usually given by Hár with occasional amplification by Jafnhárr or Þriði. Finally, Gangleri asks about Ragnarök and its aftermath, then he hears a crash and the hall disappears.

A variant of Hár, Hávi, appears in the poem Hávamál ('Words of Hávi [the High One]') as the name of Odin.

See also 
 High, Just-as-High, and Third
 List of names of Odin

References

Bibliography 

 
 
 
 
 

Characters in Norse mythology
Names of Odin